Ethnic plastic surgery, or ethnic modification, is plastic surgery intended to change an individual's appearance to look more or less like a particular race or ethnicity. Popular plastic surgery procedures which may have an ethnically-motivated component include rhinoplasty (nose surgery) and blepharoplasty (eyelid surgery).

Michael Jackson's plastic surgery has been discussed in the context of ethnic plastic surgery. In her book, Venus Envy: A History of Cosmetic Surgery, Elizabeth Haiken devotes a chapter to "The Michael Jackson Factor" presenting "black, Asian, and Jewish women who seek WASP noses and Playboy breasts. They are caught in the vexed immigrants' dilemma of struggling not only to keep up with the Joneses but to look like them, too."

Ethical considerations
Plastic surgeons Chuma J. Chike-Obi, M.D., Kofi Boahene, M.D., and Anthony E. Brissett, M.D., F.A.C.S. distinguish between motivations of aesthetics and racial transformation for patients of African descent seeking plastic surgery. In their opinion, "Patients whose desired surgical outcomes result in racial transformation should be educated about the potential risks of this objective, and these requests should generally be discouraged."

Feminist scholars have split views on the subject. Christine Overall, professor of philosophy at Queen's University at Kingston, has written that personal racial transformation, or as she puts it "transracialism", belongs to a larger class of personal surgical interventions. This larger class includes transsexual identity change, body art, cosmetic surgery, Munchhausen syndrome, and labiaplasty. Her basic thesis is that the arguments against the ethical nature of racial transformation (e.g. "it's not possible", "betrayal of group identity", "reinforces oppression", etc.) stand or fall with the ethical arguments related to transsexual change. Cressida Heyes, professor of Philosophy of Gender and Sexuality at the University of Alberta, disagrees with Overall's schema. Heyes feels that racial transformation is fundamentally different from gender transformation since race is also determined by ancestry, personal cultural history and societal definitions. Hence ethical considerations of transracial surgery are different from ethical considerations in transsexual surgery.

In popular culture
In the South Park episode "Mr. Garrison's Fancy New Vagina" Kyle undergoes an ethnic plastic surgery called "negroplasty" to qualify for the basketball team.

In the 2008 movie Tropic Thunder, Kirk Lazarus goes through a controversial surgery to make his skin darker to play an African-American soldier.

See also
 Allophilia
 Fred Korematsu
 Good hair
 Racial transformation of Michael Jackson
 Martina Big
 Oli London
 The Operated Jew
 Passing (racial identity)
 Skin whitening
 Transracial (identity)

References 

Plastic surgery
Race and society
Body modification process
Identity (social science)
Race (human categorization)
Conceptions of self
Ethically disputed medical practices
Body modification